Microtropis sabahensis is a species of plant in the family Celastraceae. It is a tree endemic to Borneo where it is confined to Sabah.

References

sabahensis
Endemic flora of Borneo
Trees of Borneo
Flora of Sabah
Vulnerable plants
Taxonomy articles created by Polbot